Ibaraki 1st district (茨城県第1区, Ibaraki-ken dai-ikku or simply 茨城1区, Ibaraki-ikku) is a single-member constituency of the House of Representatives in the national Diet of Japan. It is located in the central region of Ibaraki Prefecture, and covers the prefecture's Mito (except the former Uchihara Town), Shimotsuma (except Chiyokawa Village), Kasama (except the area of Kasama City), Chikusei, Sakuragawa, Hitachiōmiya (except Gozenyama Village), and Higashi-Ibaraki District’s Shirosato Town.

As of 2015, this district was home to 404,818 constituents.

List of representatives

Election results

2021

2017

2014

References 

Politics of Ibaraki Prefecture
Districts of the House of Representatives (Japan)